Chiomara is a genus of skippers in the family Hesperiidae.

Species
Chiomara gundlachi Skinner & Ramsden, 1924
Chiomara mithrax (Möschler, 1879)

Former species
Chiomara asychis (Stoll, [1780]) - transferred to Chiothion asychis (Stoll, [1780])
Chiomara basigutta (Plötz, 1884) - transferred to Chiothion basigutta (Plötz, 1884)
Chiomara crenda Evans, 1953 - transferred to Crenda crenda (Evans, 1953)
Chiomara georgina (Reakirt, 1868) - transferred to Chiothion georgina (Reakirt, 1868)
Chiomara khalili Riley, 1934 - transferred to Chiothion khalili (Riley, 1934)

References
Chiomara at funet

Erynnini
Hesperiidae genera
Taxa named by Frederick DuCane Godman
Taxa named by Osbert Salvin